Soultz could refer to any of three communes of Alsace in north-eastern France:
Soultz-Haut-Rhin
Soultz-sous-Forêts
Soultz-les-Bains